Pareeth Pandari is a 2017 Indian Malayalam-language drama film written and directed by Gafoor Y. Elliyaas, and starring Kalabhavan Shajohn in the lead role. This film was produced by Shybin T. under the banner of Chennai Film Factory. Pareeth Pandari is the first film of Kalabhavan Shajohn in a leading role.

Cast

 Kalabhavan Shajohn
 Ansiba Hassan
 Sajitha Madathil
 Anil
 Jayaraj Warrier
 Jaseena Zackriya
 Joy Mathew
 Tini Tom
 Jaffar Idukki
 Sunil Sukhada
 Sathaar
 Sreeni Njarackal
 Pauly Valsan
 Sudarshan Alappuzha
 Santha Kumari

References

External links

2010s Malayalam-language films